Jegathala is a village in Nilgiris, located at an altitude of  above sea level.  It is 5 km from Coonoor and 13 km from Ooty.

Villages in Nilgiris district